Vladimír Oplt (5 July 1937 – 5 January 2021) was a Czech politician who served as a Senator.

References

1937 births
2021 deaths
Czech politicians
Communist Party of Czechoslovakia politicians
Civic Democratic Party (Czech Republic) Senators
People from Kladno
Mendel University Brno alumni